Westfield Township is one of twenty townships in Fayette County, Iowa, USA.  As of the 2010 census, its population was 297.

Geography
According to the United States Census Bureau, Westfield Township covers an area of 35.4 square miles (91.7 square kilometers); of this, 35.15 square miles (91.05 square kilometers, 99.29 percent) is land and 0.25 square miles (0.65 square kilometers, 0.71 percent) is water.

The city of Fayette is entirely within this township geographically but is a separate entity.

Unincorporated towns
 Albany at 
 Lima at 
(This list is based on USGS data and may include former settlements.)

Adjacent townships
 Union Township (north)
 Pleasant Valley Township (northeast)
 Illyria Township (east)
 Fairfield Township (southeast)
 Smithfield Township (south)
 Harlan Township (southwest)
 Center Township (west)
 Windsor Township (northwest)

Cemeteries
The township contains these three cemeteries: Lima, Pleasant Hill and Saint Francis.

Major highways
  Iowa Highway 93
  Iowa Highway 150

Lakes
 Volga Lake

Landmarks
 Volga River State Recreation Area (vast majority)

School districts
 North Fayette Valley Community School District
 West Central Community School District

Political districts
 Iowa's 1st congressional district
 State House District 24
 State Senate District 12

References
 United States Census Bureau 2008 TIGER/Line Shapefiles
 United States Board on Geographic Names (GNIS)
 United States National Atlas

External links
 US-Counties.com
 City-Data.com

Townships in Fayette County, Iowa
Townships in Iowa